Sead Banda (born 16 June 1990) is a Montenegrin professional football striker playing with FK Rudar Kakanj in the First League of the Federation of Bosnia and Herzegovina.

Club career
Born in Nikšić, he started playing in the youth squad of FK Sutjeska Nikšić, but soon he will move abroad, first to Italian where he joined US Lecce and then Serbian side, and 1991 European and World Champions, Red Star Belgrade.

In 2008, he signed a 4-year contract with OFK Belgrade. Despite making his senior debut with OFK in the Serbian SuperLiga, at the end of the season he returned to Montenegro to play with his home town club FK Sutjeska Nikšić in the Montenegrin First League.

He stayed with Sutjeska for the following couple of seasons, before moving to another Montenegrin top flight club, FK Bokelj during summer 2011.  After only six months, during the winter break, he moved to FK Dečić.

In summer 2012, after the relegation of Dečić, he returned to FK Bokelj. During the winter break of the 2012–13 season, he moved to Bosnia and joined second-level club NK Bosna Visoko.  In summer 2013 he moved to FK Rudar Kakanj.

International career
Sead has made part of Montenegrin under-19 and under-21 teams.

References

1990 births
Living people
Footballers from Nikšić
Association football forwards
Montenegrin footballers
Montenegro youth international footballers
Montenegro under-21 international footballers
OFK Beograd players
FK Sutjeska Nikšić players
FK Čelik Nikšić players
FK Bokelj players
FK Dečić players
NK Bosna Visoko players
FK Rudar Kakanj players
Serbian SuperLiga players
Montenegrin First League players
First League of the Federation of Bosnia and Herzegovina players
Montenegrin expatriate footballers
Expatriate footballers in Serbia
Montenegrin expatriate sportspeople in Serbia
Expatriate footballers in Bosnia and Herzegovina
Montenegrin expatriate sportspeople in Bosnia and Herzegovina